Monterado was a comune (municipality) in the Province of Ancona in the Italian region Marche, located about  west of Ancona.

The municipality of Monterado was disbanded 1 January 2014 and united to Castel Colonna and Ripe in the new municipality of Trecastelli.

Demographic evolution

References

Cities and towns in the Marche
Trecastelli